Leonard Bailey may refer to:

 Leonard Bailey (inventor) (1825–1905), inventor/toolmaker and patenter of the plane (tool)
 Leonard Lee Bailey (1942–2019), surgeon who transplanted a baboon heart into Baby Fae
 Leonard C. Bailey (1825–1918), African-American business owner and inventor